Hébrard is a surname and may refer to:

 Ernest Hébrard  (1875–1933) French architect, archaeologist and urban planner 
 Henri Hébrard de Villeneuve  (1848 –1925)  French fencer
 Jacques Hébrard (1841–1917), French journalist and politician
 Joris Hébrard (1982-), French politician